Pieter Wijdekop (13 September 1912 – 1 September 1982), known as "Piet", was a Dutch sprint canoeist who competed in the late 1930s. He won a bronze medal in the folding K-2 10000 m event with his younger brother Kees at the 1936 Summer Olympics in Berlin.

The Wijdekop brothers were born in Amsterdam, where they were members of the canoe club De Plassers. In their honor, an international marathon canoe race up and down between Amsterdam and Purmerend, organized yearly until 2008, was named the Gebroeders Wijdekop Race. Piet died in Heemskerk in 1982.

References

External links
 
 
 

1912 births
1982 deaths
Dutch male canoeists
Olympic canoeists of the Netherlands
Olympic bronze medalists for the Netherlands
Olympic medalists in canoeing
Canoeists at the 1936 Summer Olympics
Medalists at the 1936 Summer Olympics
Sportspeople from Amsterdam
20th-century Dutch people